Charlotte Morgan (born 1976) is a British female mountain runner, world champion at the World Long Distance Mountain Running Championships (2018) and she was also silver medal with the national team.

References

External links
 Charlotte Morgan at Power of 10

1976 births
Living people
British female mountain runners
World Long Distance Mountain Running Championships winners